Kalanag or Black Peak (6,387 m) is the highest peak in the Saraswati (Bandarpunch) mountain range, others being Saraswati Devi Parvat (Bandarpunch I, 6,316 m) and Hanuman Parvat (White Peak or Bandarpunch II, 6,102 m). It literally means "Black Cobra". It is close to the Ruinsara Valley. The peak was first summited in 1955 by Jack Gibson and students of The Doon School, Dehradun.

See also
Role of The Doon School in Indian mountaineering
 List of Himalayan peaks of Uttarakhand

References

Mountains of Uttarakhand
Six-thousanders of the Himalayas